Dennis Michael Borcky (born September 14, 1964) is a former American football nose tackle who played one season for the New York Giants in 1987.

References

1964 births
New York Giants players
American football defensive tackles
Memphis Tigers football players
Living people
National Football League replacement players